The Fair Oaks–Fairfax Boulevard Line, designated as Route 1C, is a daily bus route operated by the Washington Metropolitan Area Transit Authority between the Dunn Loring station of the Orange Line of the Washington Metro and McConnell Public Safety and Transportation Operations Center on the weekdays and Fair Oaks Mall on the weekends. This line provides service within the neighborhoods of Merrifield and Fair Oaks in Fairfax County and the City of Fairfax. Trips are roughly 30 minutes on weekdays, and 60 minutes on weekends.

Route Description and Service

The 1C operates from Four Mile Run division on a daily schedule. The 1C operates on weekdays between Dunn Loring station and McConnell Public Safety and Transportation Operations Center via Arlington Boulevard and Fairfax Boulevard. During the weekends, the 1C operates on a shortened route, operating up to Fair Oaks Mall. The 1C runs through the neighborhoods in Fairfax County, such as Merrifield and Woodburn, within Arlington Boulevard. The 1C also runs through marketplaces and businesses in Fairfax County and the City of Fairfax.

History

Route 1C was initially part of the Wilson Boulevard–Fairfax Line, when the route was introduced in 1983 following the split of the Wilson Boulevard Line. The 1C served the line without any route changes until June 24, 2007, when the 1C splits from the Wilson Boulevard–Fairfax Line.

Fair Oaks–Dunn Loring Line

The original name of the line that operated the 1C was the Fair Oaks–Dunn Loring Line. The 1C operates between Dunn Loring station and Fair Oaks Mall. The 1C have select trips that operates up to Fairfax Circle during early morning and weeknight trips. Throughout the years, the 1C remains the same until the line changes its name to Fair Oaks–Fairfax Boulevard Line on December 29, 2013 following its extension to McConnell Public Safety and Transportation Operations Center.

June 2007 Changes

On June 24, 2007, the 1C no longer operates to Ballston station, as the route was truncated to Dunn Loring station. The eastern half was replaced by the 1A. The 1C originally operated alongside the 1Z during rush hours, and following these changes, the 1Z follows rush hour times with the 1A.

2013 Proposed Changes

In 2013, WMATA proposed an extension to the 1C.

Prior to the budget proposal, WMATA planned to reroute the 1C from Lee Jackson Memorial Highway to Random Hills Road before arriving to Fair Oaks Mall. Along with the road changes, it was also proposed to extend the 1C to McConnell Public Safety and Transportation Operations Center to bring in connection to other bus routes. This extension leads to serve the Fair Oaks Mall stops in both directions.

WMATA later revised the proposal by rerouting the 1C from Lee Jackson Memorial Highway to Fairfax County Government Center via Government Center Parkway before arriving to Fair Oaks Mall. The 1C extension remains the same from the original proposal.

The reason why WMATA planned these changes, was to bring in more service to Lee Highway, the neighborhood of Fair Oaks, and the Fairfax County Government Center, alongside service to West Ox Road.

December 2013 Changes
On December 29, 2013, the 1C extended to serve McConnell Public Safety and Transportation Operations Center in Fair Oaks. The 1C only serves this stop during weekdays, as the 1C operates up to Fair Oaks Mall during the weekends. The short late night and early trips to Fairfax Circle is discontinued.

Proposed Elimination

In 2016 during WMATA's FY2018 budget, it was proposed to eliminate route 1C to reduce costs and has a high subsidy per rider. According to performance measure it goes as the following for WMATA:

However, the official service changes on June 26, 2016 remains unchanged for the 1C, as trip times was adjusted to make the 1C reliable.

September 2020 proposed changes 
On September 10, 2020 as part of its FY2022 proposed budget, WMATA proposed to truncate route 1C service to Fair Oaks Mall in order to reduce costs and low federal funds. WMATA also proposed to reduce weekday frequency on the 1C.

March 2021 changes 

On March 14, 2021, the weekday 1C trips was truncated back to Fair Oaks Mall, no longer operating to McConnell Public Safety and Transportation Operations Center due to the closure of the West Ox Division. The weekend 1C trips remains unchanged.

References

1C